Beddington can refer to:

Places
Beddington and Beddington Park, a place between Sutton and Croydon (boroughs of London, England)
Beddington Heights, Calgary, a neighbourhood in Calgary, Alberta, Canada
Beddington, Maine, a town in Washington County, Maine, United States
Municipal Borough of Beddington and Wallington, a municipal borough in Surrey, England
Bedington, West Virginia, an unincorporated hamlet in Berkeley County, West Virginia, United States

People
Beddington (surname)

Other
Beddington Lane tram stop, on the Tramlink service in London, England